Amr ibn Ma'adi Yakrib al-Zubaīdi al-Madḥ'hijī (died c. 642) was an Arabian cavalry commander from the Zubaid clan in Yemen, part of the Madhhij tribe confederation. Amr has developed a mythical reputation as a legendary warrior in Arabia.  He is said to have engaged in numerous battles against other legendary figures such as Amir ibn Tufail, Antarah ibn Shaddad and Dorayd bin Al Soma. Amr was also known as a leading figure in Arabic poetry. Werner Daum noted that Amr was the most famous and legendary of Arabian heroes.

Amr converted to Islam at the time of prophet Muhammad and became one of the two champions praised by the Rashidun caliphs as possessing the strength of 1,000 soldiers, the other champion being Tulayha. He participated in famous battles such as battle of the Yarmuk and the battle of al-Qadisiyyah, where it is reported that Amr was one of the fiercest Muslim warriors during the battle against the elephants of the Sassanids.  He also participated in the battle of Jalula, where he led the Rashidun cavalry company. Later, Amr participated in the Muslim conquest of Khorasan. Amr was killed during the Battle of Nahavand in 642.

Amr had several famous swords that became subjects of certain legends of later Arabic poetry particularly during Abbasid caliphate, such as those swords named Dhu al-Nun, al-Qalzam and ash-Shamsharah. However, the most famous sword that belonged to Amr was the as-Sayf al-Qala'i, which was named "al-Samsarah", which literally means "killing on the spot". It reportedly originated from the time of ʿĀd. Aside from the swords, as a master equestrian, Amr possessed many  warhorses.

Arab tribes residing mainly in Iraq, particularly the sub-branches of Zubaid such as Jubur, Obaid and Al Uqaydat, claim to be direct patrilineal descendants of Amr ibn Ma'adi Yakrib

Biography 

At the time of Muhammed, the Zubaidi clan of Qahtanite tribe confederation had split into two divisions which were called Zubaid al-Kabir (Zubaid the greater) and Zubaid al-Asgar (Zubaid the lesser).  Amr hailed from the Zubaid al-Asgar subdivision. The Zubaid al-Asgar traced their progeny from the sub branch of Banu Asam clan. Amr's father, Maʻadī Yakrib ibn Abd Allah, was the clan chieftain. Amr was said to be born 75 years before Hijri year as quoted by Hussain Jam'a from several modern historians. Amr had a sister named Rayhanah, and a brother named Abd, who was killed by a Yemenite Madhhij tribe which came from different branch of clan.

According to classical sources, Amr ibn Ma'adi Yakrib has even lived long enough before Islam, as he met Abd al-Muttalib, grandfather of Muhammad. He also met Abraha, a famous Aksumite warlord who according to a narrative from Al-Fil chapter of Quran was destroyed by the hell birds sent by God during his invasion to Mecca. Amr was able to point out several historical landmarks of early medieval Yemen, such as a fortress which was built by Abraha which was called al-Ma'in fortress.

For his eloquence on his poets, Amr once also served as a delegation of poets of Lakhmid king Al-Nu'man III ibn al-Mundhir.

Pre-Islamic battles 
As Amr lived to a great age spanning from before the advent of Islam, he has very long records of battle experience during his life. His career of raids, plunders, and battles that filled most of his pre-Islamic lifetime were recorded with various accountability. Yemeni Mu'tazilite scholar Nashwan ibn Sa'id Al-Hamiri has said that Amr ibn Ma'adi Yakrib reached mythical reputation in pre-Islamic or Jahiliyyah chronicles. As indicated from ancient poems, it was recorded that Amr had defeated and captured many pre-Islamic Arabian legendary warriors such as Amir ibn al-Tufail, the chieftain of the Amir ibn Sa'sa'ah tribe, Antarah ibn Shaddad and Durayd ibn Summah al-Jashimi before Islam. Some legendary tradition also depicted Amr's extraordinary feats when he encountered two lionesses and killed both of the beasts in one particular occasion.

The face off between Amr and Antarah was one of the most quoted poetries since it was regarded as the clash between the two of the best warrior poets of the era. Amr was said to have been the son of one of the rivals of Antarah. The epic of the duel between Antara and Amr, and it conclusion of Amr subdued his powerful enemy and later freed him were caught in the long poetry which was recorded by Abu al-ʽAbbās Thaʽlab. The capture of Antara happened during a battle which was called Ghazwat al-Tatlit. The memorial of their most famous conflict were recorded in Al-ʿIqd al-Farīd 

Meanwhile, his face-off against Durayd was also regarded as no less prominent as Durayd was known as a hero from Hawazin, who had experienced more than a hundred battles during his life including the Fijar Wars, and lived past the age of one hundred years before being slain in the battle of Hunain against Muhammad. In fact, Abu Ubaydah Mu'ammar ibn Muthanna, a famous littérateur and writer from Basra during the 8th century, has acknowledged Amr, Antarah, and Durayd as three of the finest cavaliers of the past era. Amr reported that he first meet Durayd during one of his raids against Hawazin. One of the conflict between Amr and Durayd involved that when Durayd raided the Zubaidi clan and took captive of Rayhana, sister of Amr. This prompted Amr and his clan to launch the vendetta assault repeatedly against the Hawazin, until they defeated the latter and captured Durayd as prisoner.

The conflict against Amir ibn Tufayl was one of the most notable, having gained several spots in the historical narratives which were found in pre-Islamic Arabian poetries. Amir ibn Tufayl later married Rayhanah, sister of Amr. However, their relationship fell apart when there was a quarrel between Amir and Amr, where Amir defeated and captured Amr during the conflict between them. Their rivalry was culminated further, as Amr then rode to the banu Amir ibn Sa'sa'ah settlement and challenges Amir. Now in turn, Amr disarmed Amir and shook  him off from his horse to fall into the ground, after grabbing the stabbing the spear which was held by Amir. Amr then captured him and ended the battle, and brought Amir to his home with hands tied and humiliated.

Another notable conflict of Amr during his Jahiliyya era was against Abbas ibn Mirdas, another Amr's contemporary famous heroic figure of Arabia hailed from Banu Sulaym, who was similar like Amr also lived long enough to meet Muhammad, witnessed and confessed to Islam during his life. Amr told caliph Umar during the era of Rashidun, that Abbas ibn Mirdas as-Sulami was a member of a collective group of six powerful Arab horsemen, which Amr said that Abbas was the best of the six. The story of their conflict was recorded in the book of Shia litterateur, genealogist Abu al-Faraj al-Isfahani in his book, Kitab al-Aghani. The structural narratives from the taunting poems which were produced by both Abbas and Amr in this incident has drawn picture regarding the war between the Zubaid clan of Amr against the Sulaim clan of Abbas. There were mention of assaults from both sides, the killings happened during their battles, the raids and the sheep flocks capturing, and also the length of the conflict as recorded from Abbas poem was a period of ninety nine (99) days. Another separate authority of poetry narration recorded by Abul Abbas Tha'alab has mentioned that during their conflict, Amr once managed to capture and seize Abbas in his arm by Abbas hair, before Amr later let Abbas to go and pardoned him. Another pre-Islamic narratives of conversation between Abbas with Amr ibn Tufail also mentioned Amr name in their talk.

As Amr has reported his past deeds when asked by Umar about his reputations as a warrior which has circulated within Arabian community of his era, Amr testifies in his own accounts that among the bravest peoples he ever faced were three persons: 
 The first person was a young warrior from a clan of Sha'bah named Harith ibn Sa'ad who has beaten Amr thrice in series of duel in a row. Amr narrated that Harith was so nimble in combat that he even jumped off his horse to avoid Amr strikes, only to emerge from behind of Amr. Amr said to Umar that he felt humiliated by this defeats while spared by Harith, which then prompted Amr befriend Harith as he respected the strength of the young warrior. 
According to The Meadows of Gold work by Al-Masudi, this conflict happened during the Zubaid clan raid against Kinana, where Amr and his clansmen has managed to seize the spoils and the wife of Rabia, who then chased the raiding force and confronted Amr. Amr told this story to Umar that he fought inconclusive duels against Rabia. As a result, he gave back the wife and the spoils to Rabia. 
 The third person Amr praised as the bravest opponent he encountered during his life was his old rival who clashed with him numerous time, Amir ibn Tufail.

Aside from his much famous poetries which were quoted by various historians, as the Zubaidi were known as one of the Arab tribes which engaged in various pre-Islamic tribal warfare. There are various accounts of other Amr lesser known adventures and battles in the past, which were recorded in the form of oral traditions and poetries that has been preserved for generations: As Amr had farms and a house in Tatlit, near Abha, in modern Asir Region, adjacent to the settlement of the Khawlan clan, the majority of his conflicts and battles occurred in the far north of Yemen.

 First record of Amr battle was during the battle between Zubaid tribe against Khath'am tribe, where at first the Khat'am prevailed, until Amr went to fight and turn the tide of the battle and secured victory for the Zubaid. Amr was said managed to started acknowledged for this battle.
Al-Hindani mentioned from Samir Al-Fursan Al-Yami; that Amr and his Zubaid clansmen launched a devastating raid toward the Khawlan, killing scores of the Khawlan, entered their fields and acquired massive spoils of sheep and gold. Amr then presented the spoils to his uncles, Sa'ad and Shihab.
 The Diwan of Imru' al-Qais stated that Amr and his brother, Abdullah, fought the battle against  which resulted in victory for Amr as they repelled the Mazin tribe.
 The invasion against the sub branch of Banu Hamdan, the clan of Banu Asid which occurred after the Asid clan raided the Zubaidis and plundered many possessions of the Zubaidi, including equipments and horse of Amr in the valley of Zubaid. Amr then was said to led his army in vendetta war, where he professed he slaughtered thousand of Asheed clansmen in this conflict.
 The battle against Banu Ziyad al-Harith ibn Ka'ab, where Amr reported that the women's of Banu Ziyad were cheering during the battle. This battle was recorded by Yaqut al-Hamawi in his book Mu'ujam al-Buldan. Modern Yemeni historian Sulaiman Issa examined that the battles Amr engaged with the clan of Bani Al-Harith bin Ka'b, who also hailed from Madhij tribe confederation, under the leadership of Al-Sajf bin Qais bin Al-Ghaz, who invaded Amr place in Wadi Zubaid.
 The battle of "Day of Bawar", the battle against Banu Sa'adi, which Amr took pride for their victory against the latter.
 The battle of "Day of Sa'adi", another day battle against Banu Sa'adi which was also won by Amr and his Zubaid clan. Amr gave memorial of the battle through his personal poet of the victory.
 Raid of Amr against Banu Hamdan, which caused the Hamdani famed poem named Hashash. Al-Asghar ibn Hashash al-Bakili ash-Shakri escaped the attack and took refugee towards nearby settlement, where Hashash al-Ashgar recite a poem which narrated the attack of Amr towards his tribe. 
 Amr clashed with the Sa'adian clan lead by Rabiah bin Sa'ad, and he entered the fortress of An'am that belonged to Sa'ad clan and destroyed it during one of his raids.
 There are account from poet which was reported by a Zubaidi clan warrior named Qadi Abu al-Husain, who testified that during a raid under Amr command against the Ghatafan tribe, he heard that there is a stranger who moaned while reciting poet sighed there are no one among his tribe dare to oppose Amr ibn Ma'adi Yakrib, which prompted the poet contemplating to pay warriors from other clan instead who dare to stand against Amr and his Zubaid raiders.
 Amr also once told a story to Umar during Rashidun caliphate era about a story, that Amr once faced a certain warrior who challenged him to duel in a midst of battle. This particular enemy caused his enemy to be frightened to death, just solely because the man heard the name of Amr ibn Ma'adi Yakarib. Amr concluded by remarking that this man was among the most cowardly opponent he ever faced during his life.
 The saga of Amr raid against Banu Nabhan which was found in the divans or Saga of Antarah ibn Shaddad.
 A story which Amr told Umar about his revenge assault towards a particular clan from Kinda confederation, as the clan once raided the Madhhij clan of Amr and took away captive of some women of Madhhij, which was immediately responded by Amr, he took his horse and ride alone towards the settlement of the mentioned Kinda clan, where Amr said he prevailed fighting against the whole of their clan warriors by himself.
 A raid against the Hawazin tribe which was found in the Diwan of Amr ibn Ma'adi Yakrib compilation.
 The adventure of Amr in capturing several notable warriors such as Sinan bin Abi Haritha, Al-Harith bin Zalim, Hashim ibn Harmala, and Husayn ibn Harmala, which was followed by Amr's defeat and capture of an Arabian soldier named Khiyar ibn Murrah al-Marri. The Diwan narration has recorded that this happened in Souk Okaz market after he performed Hajj.
 A relatively vague mention of the conflict between Amr clan of Madhhij against a certain clan from Qaysite tribe.
 Another accounts from Sirat Antar (saga of Antarah), which was recorded by Ali ibn Zabid during the time of Abbasid Caliphate, also recorded that as Amr was undergoing a marriage procession with a woman named Lamis, the procession marriage was said to be attacked by a figure named Urwah, who was in love with Lamis. However, Urwah was defeated and captured by Amr during the battle. 
 The long narration of Amr conflict with Urwah was continued with further sequence of another Amr's fight against a black skinned warrior named Sulaik ibn Silkah. Then as Lamis worried about Amr fighting such a ferocious warrior, Lamis released and plead to him to help Amr, which caused Sulaik to flee. Later, Antarah intercede the incident and decide to give Lamis to Urwah, who turned down Antarah's offer, as he thought that Lamis now preferred being in love with Amr. According to Peter Heath, the event was that Amr was under the mercy of Urwah ibn al-Ward, who has been urged by Antarah to kill Amr so as to take Lamis as his wife.
 There are some accounts of Amr admitting that he has lost in several skirmishes against a young hero named Rabia ibn Zayd, who rescued his sister from Amr.
 The conflict which involved Zubaid, Amr clan, where they allied with the tribe of Jurm clan against a coalition of Banu al-Harith and Banu Nahdi tribal clans, with Amr himself commanding the Zubaid and Jurm coalition armies. However, the alliance between Zubaid and Jurm broke in the middle of the war, which now caused the Zubaid now in turn fighting Jurm instead. Then as the two former allies fight each other, Amr led the victorious battle against the Jurm. Amr reportedly has captured several enemies on his personal effort.

Sassanid Yemen 

There is mention of Amr's involvement in long dramatical event of Aksumite–Persian wars as the Yemeni Arab tribes coalitions who resented the Axumite rule which prompted the Yemeni agreed to form coalition through their figure, Sayf ibn Dhi Yazan with the Sasanian Empire. According to Tabari, the undermanned Yemeni-Sasanian alliance won a "miraculous" victory, and expelled the Aksumite from Arabian peninsula. After the death of Sayf due during the second invasion of Aksumite, Amr were mentioned as one of the tribal chief who agreed to support the resistance against the Aksumite and later agreed to fight under command of Badhan against the Aksumites, which successful repulsing of the Aksumite elements permanently, thus prompting Yemen became Sasanian Yemen, a Sasanian protectorate region.

However, as the Yemeni Arabs in the Madhhij dwelling region grew discontent with the rule of Sassanids, as they are not willing to submit under faction which they though as another foreign invader, they revolted. The revolt were spearheaded by the now united Madhhij Arabian tribes, where the first clash against the Sassanids occurred in the Madhab Valley in Al-Jawf, in Ramadan 2 AH / 622 AD, where Amr participated in this battle. The Madhhij suffered heavy losses as numerous of their clan chieftains were fallen, with the survivors of the battle can be counted including Amr and his nephew, Qays ibn Maksuh.

Convert to Islam & rebellion 

Regarding the connection between Amr with the Quraysh tribe, which Muhammad hailed, it was implied that before the time of Islam, Amr and Tulayha, another famed pre-Islamic knight hailed from Asad tribe, were used to be hired for their service by the Meccan Qurayshite in some of their battles against opposing tribes, During within Muhammad life, Amr were said to be entangled in an affair which involved his long time rival Amir ibn Tufail, who once has captured Amr and married his sister Raihanah. Amir ibn Tufail were captured by Untairah, a female warrior sister of prominent figure named Dhu al-Kalab. However, due to intercession from Amr, Untairah agreed to release Amir, who decided then to attack Muhammad, a Meccan Qurayshite who preaching Islam. It is said before he mount his attack, Amir ibn Tufail died from neck tumor due to the prayer of Muhammad against his malicious intent.

At the time when Muhammad preaching about Islam faith, Amr heard about it and compelled to meet Muhammad. Amr urging Qays ibn Maksuh to go with him to check whether it is true Muhammad claim as prophet, which Qays rejected. Then in turn, Amr go by himself to meet Muhammad, which impressed him and prompted him to convert to Islam as he meet the latter. As he embraced Islam during Muhammad life, his sword which named al-Samsarah,(translated as "killing on the spot",) were a sword of as-Sayf al-Qala'i type, were rewarded to Khalid ibn Sa'id as Khalid were appointed as Muhammad administrator in Yemen. This happened as Khalid ibn Sa'id were on his way to Yemen, suddenly the tribesmen of Amr from Zubaydi passed through khalid and attacking him. As the result was those tribesmen of Amr were captured, then Amr gave his al-Samsara sword to Khalid as guarantee to free them and allow them to accept Islam instead. Amr sword which called as-Sayf al-Qala'i are presumably originated from the Arabian-Indian sea trade, which according to Ali ibn al-Athir, has become the standard of Arab Muslim army weapons during the time of Muhammad. Aside from other several famous swords that are named Dhu al-Nun and al-Qalzam.

After Amr has met with Muhammad, he participated in the second Madhhij revolution against the Sassanid occupants, where several Madhhij who has professed to Islam including Amr, Qais ibn Maksuh, Qais ibn Al-Hussein, Yazid bin Abdul Madan, Yazid ibn Al-Mahjal, Yazid ibn Al-Afkal, and Yazid ibn Dhi Jarrah Al-Hamiri, involved in this second attempt to retake their control of their lands from the Sassanid administrators. This time Amr and the other Madhhij leaders managed defeat the Sassanid force of Al-Abna' and expelling the Sassanid elements from the regions where clans of Madhhij dwells.

Later, during the great Ridda Wars, Qays curtailed the forces of Yemeni rebel leader who claimed himself as prophet named Al-Aswad al-Ansi. However, both Amr and Qays later revolted against the caliphate of Abu Bakar as both did not agree with new administrator appointed by the caliph, thus they seceded from leadership of Farwah, who acted as their regions governor at the time. Amr and Qays ibn Maksuh then conspired to kill three caliphate deputies in Yemen. Both Amr and Qays were rallied under for the second insurrection in Yemen. However, both were defeated by the force of Ikrima ibn Abi Jahl. Amr and Qays were said to be captured by Fayruz al-Daylami. According to the record of Usd al-ghabah fi marifat al-Saḥabah, Amr came to Medina as prisoner and guarded by caliphate soldier named Al-Muhajir ibn Abi Umayya. Amr then brought to caliph Abu Bakar, who invite him to Islam again, which Amr agreed upon. Thus, Amr then being pardoned by the caliph.

Muslim conquest of Levant 

According to Yemeni historian professor Sulaiman Issa, Amr brought along the stocks of Zubaidi tribesmen from Tihamah to participate in the Muslim conquest of the Levant. In 634, According to Hisham ibn al-Kalbi, after Khalid ibn Sa'id fallen in the battle of Marj al-Saffar, with the sword of al-Samsara previously belonged to Amr were found next to his lifeless body. Then Mu'awiyah acquired the sword in his possession.

Siege of Damascus 
Later, Amr participated in Siege of Damascus, where his arrival alongside Abu Sufyan ibn Harb were rejoiced by the Rashidun soldiers. At one point, Thomas, the garrison commander of Damascus decided to lead the breakthrough against the siege by assembling forces in the eastern gate more numerous than the other gates, so that Khalid would be unable to move to Shurahbil's assistance and take command in that decisive sector. Thomas attack at several gates also gave more flexibility to the operation: if success were achieved in any sector other than the Gate of Thomas, such success could be exploited by sending troops to that sector to achieve the breakthrough. As the East Gate, the situation also became serious, for a larger Byzantine force had been assigned to this sector, Rafay ibn Umayr was unable to withstand their attacks. Only the timely arrival of Khalid with his 400 veteran cavalry and his subsequent attack on the Roman flank, marked the turning point in the sally at the Eastern Gate. Amr and Khalid then positioned on the front of eastern gate of Damascus.

Campaign in Emesa province 
Later, Amr involved in the Siege of Emesa in 636 along with Kindite tribe soldiers, where he marched to rendezvous with Abu Ubayda ibn al-Jarrah, who just pacified Jerusalem. At first, a Byzantine commander from Baalbek named Harbees were sent to Homs in response to Muslims siege of the city. Then, as Harbees led a sally in attempt to break the encirclement, they immediately collided with patrolling troops of Rashidun which led by Amr, Dhiraar ibn al-Azwar, Abdul Rahman ibn Abi Bakr, Rabia ibn Amr, Malik Al-Ashtar. The forces of Harbees swiftly demolished by the Rashidun troops of Amr, which caused the city of Emesa captured in no time as there are no more adequate defense left. Amr and Dhiraar then continues by leading more than 5,000 cavalry troops joining Maysarah ibn Masruq to besiege Homs.

Later, as the campaign in Homs governate continued, Amr and about twenty mounted warriors consisted of Dhiraar ibn al-Azwar, Qais ibn Hubairah, Abdul-Rahman ibn Abi Bakr, Malik al-Ashtar, Auf ibn Salam, Sabr ibn kalkal, Mazin ibn Amr, Asid ibn Salamah, Rabia ibn Amr, Ikrimah bin Abi Jahl, and others entered the city of Al-Rastan. During the siege of al-Rastan, it is recorded that the supreme commander of Rashidun, Abu Ubaydah, employing military deception that allowed Amr and about 20 warriors to enter the city, and causing chaos once they are inside of the wall while also opening the gate from inside and allowing the Muslim armies to overwhelm the defense, thus allowing the city to be captured despite it has very strong fortification defense.

Battle of Yarmuk 
Later, Amr ibn Ma'adi-Yakrib were recorded has participated in the Battle of the Yarmuk, where Amr led soldiers from his clansmen, the Zubaid clan, on the right flank of the Rashidun army. Amr fought bravely in Yarmuk as he once fought a groups of enemy soldiers whom he slay one by one, causing the remaining soldiers retreated until they stopped in one of the Byzantine encampment in the rear of the battle. However, Amr has lost one of his eye during this battle. It is said that he lost one of his sight due to smallpox.

Muslim conquest of Persia 

As the battle of Yarmuk was over, Sa'd b. Abi Waqqas asked the Khalifah Umar ibn al-Khattab to send him reinforcement for the battle of Qadisiyah. Ibn Asakir has recorded, that according to Abu Ubayda ibn al-Jarrah, commander of Rashidun army in Levant, Amr were among nineteen veterans that participated in Yarmuk to be sent into Qadisiyyah. As Umar took precaution after the disaster befall upon Rashidun army in the Battle of the Bridge, he immediately instructed several commander to take their detachments to go to Qadisiyyah, where the Madhhij contingent sending 1,200 of their fighters led three leaders, which are Amr, Abu Suhra bin Dhu'ayb, and Yazid ibn al-Harith as-Sada'i. Amr was sent along with Tulayha and al-Qa'qa as commander to Qadisiyyah. Umar instructed Sa'd to both Amr and Tulayha regarding military matters, as Umar held both of Amr and Tulayha wisdom highly regarding warfare, while in addition, Umar also addressed to Sa'd in his letter:

Battle of al-Qadisiyah 
After arriving in Qadisiyyah, Sa'ad ibn Abi Waqqas, the supreme commander of Rashidun army in Iraq, and the Rashidun army in Iraq were rejoiced with the arrival of both Amr and Tulayha, as they acknowledged particularly by the Qurayshite as heroes who often hired by the Quraysh tribe to fight their wars in the past time during the era of Pre-Islamic Arabia. Amr then sent by Sa'ad as envoy to Rostam to give the Sassanid message as they offering Rostam between converting to Islam, surrender and paying Jizya tribute, or war. Abu Ubaidah testified in one narration that Amr has reached the age of one hundred and six years old as he attended al-Qadisiyah.

Pre-battle scouting 
Later Sa'd ibn Abi Waqqas sent Amr, Tulayha, and group of Rashidun scouts through the enemy territory to gather information. After two days of journey the scouts spotted the first wave that they though vanguards of Rostam army which they estimate numbered around 70,000, which then Tulayha and Ibn Ma'adi to sent the scouts return to report their findings to Sa'ad, while Tulayha and Ibn Ma'adi continued to gather intel by themselves. Then Tulayha and Ibn Ma'adi managed to trace the second and the third wave which they believe a centre and rear of the army, numbered 100,000 and 70,000 respectively. Amr urged to Tulayha to return as they have achieved their mission to spots the enemy army, which responded by Tulayha to wait for one more day, as Tulayha instigate one man raid during the night, as he infiltrate inside the rear encampment where Rostam tent located. Tabari particularly detailed in one chain of Narrations the circumstances in which Tulayha infiltrated the Sassanid camps under the cover of darkness, Tulayha cut the ropes of the Sassanid rear army tents while bringing torches to ignite the fires within the camp. Tulayha singlehandedly wreaking havoc in their camps, killing two Sassanid soldiers, As the confused Sassanid army plunged into chaos, taking two horses and then brought back one captive to Sa'ad ibn abi Waqqas.

The horses, according to Tulayha himself, were belonged to Rostam. Then as Tulayha return to Amr location, where he has been waiting for Tulayha outside the camp, they immediately retreat with the stolen horse to report Sa'ad about the number of enemy forces were consisted of 240,000, completing the previous scouts report.

Four days of battles 

Later, as the battle of Qadisiyyah started, the Rashidun cavalry collided against the Sassanid cavalry. then as the intense battle are ongoing between Rashidun horsemens and Sassanid horsemens, suddenly one of Sassanid champion challenging for duel or Mard o mard. Amr responded to this challenge and fought the Sassanid, only shortly for Amr to seize his neck, slamming him to the ground and killed the Sassanid, as Amr simply remarked insult as "the persian were [stupid like] goat, once they drop their bows.". In another occasion, as Amr ventured with between the Rashidun and Sassanid lines on top of his horse, a Sassanid archer were taking position in the frontline and immediately shooting Amr, which barely missed and only hit a bow edge hung on Amr shoulder. Then Amr responded by rushing towards a Sassanid archer, dragging him down from his horse, seizing and breaking his neck, then slit his throat with his sword, and dragging the lifeless body of the Sassanid archer to the Muslim rank and throw it to the front of them, as a gesture to encourage the Muslims to fight harder like he did.

At the end of the first day, the elephants of Sassanid army leaving the battlefield due to Asim ibn Amr al-Tamimi ploy by scaring away the alpha male of the elephants herd, which according to Tabari identified by more brighter skin and bigger than other elephants, from the battlefield, and the left rank of the Muslims managed to stall the onslaught of Persian heavy cavalries.

Meanwhile, at the end of the second day, Bahman Jaduya, Sassanid right-wing commander, were killed by al-Qa'qa.

In the third day of the battle which called the day of Imash when the Sassanid elephant corps going rampage towards the Rashidun ranks, Amr playing important role as he were one of the Muslim warriors who fought off the elephants onslaught. Amr were the one who instructed the Rashidun soldiers to sever the trunks of the elephants, which done so by the soldiers around him and stopped their advance. Historical narratives from poets recited during this battle revealed that Amr were the first to realize the elephants of Sassanid armies had paralyzed the horses of Rashidun, as the mounts were not used to being close with such animals. Then Amr charged along with Khalid ibn Urfuta, Jarir ibn Abdullah Al-Bajali, Al-Qaqa', Tulayha, Amr and Dhiraar ibn al-Khattab to turn and engage against the elephant corps, aiming their weapons to pierce the elephants' eyes, while also aiming to kill the elephant riders. According to eyewitness of the third day battle, Amr fought fiercely until he charged plunged alone into deeper enemy ranks and surrounded by the Sassanid soldiers, while his horse was incapacitated by enemy arrows. At-Tartusi, author of Sirah al-Mulk, mentioned this episode as forty to seventy elephants advanced towards the Muslims rank, Amr gathered himself and charging alone until he crossed the bridge which separated the Rashidun forces, where Amr fighting alone surrounded by the enemy as the Zubaid clan soldiers failed to follow and reach Amr. Regardless, when the Muslim soldiers managed to reach the encirclement of Amr, they found Amr were still alive and fighting alone inside the enemy ranks. The Muslim soldiers amazed as they see Amr are currently grabbing and holding the hind legs of an enemy horse with his hands, as the horse cannot move by Amr grabbing strength, while the Sassanid rider helplessly struggled while swinging his sword against Amr without success, thus the rider gave up his horse to Amr running on foot as the Rashidun soldiers reached Amr. When asked where his own horse, Amr simply replied that his horse has died to enemy arrows.

The third day ended with the elephant corps of the Sassanid forces permanently neutralized due to combined efforts of Amr, Tulayha, Dhiraar ibn al-Azwar, al-Qa'qa, Khalid ibn Urfuta, and Jarir ibn Abdullah repelling the elephants, while the commander of the elephant corps, Jalinus, were also slain. Amr suffered many injuries, including a stab wound from enemy spear during this phase, although he still standing with a sword in his hand.

During the fourth day of the battle of Qadisiyyah, Al-Qa`qa` plotted a plan to end the fierce fighting against the Muslims and the Persians; so he suggested his plan towards his superior, al Muthanna ibn Haritha, about leading a special unit to exploit the intensity of the deadlock battle as he will charge and slip onto small gap between Sassanid lines and assassinate Rostam. al-Qa'qa personally choose group of tribal chiefs who were known for strength and valorous, such as Amr ibn Ma'adi Yakrib, Al-Ash'ath ibn Qays, and Ibn Dhul-Bardain for this mission task. As the battle started, al-Qa'qa then execute the plan as he immediately galloped forward with his special units that included Amr on a daring charge to penetrate the surprised Sasanian lines. As the Sassanid soldiers unexpected such maneuver, al-Qa'qa and his units managed to reach the enemy commander, Rostam Farrokhzad. Amr managed to kill one of Rostam's escort and seized his golden bracelets and other brocade coat, while later according to Tabari, Rostam was killed by Amr comrade named Ullafah. At this stage, Ya'qubi has recorded, that Amr, along with Dhiraar ibn al-Azwar, Tulayha, and Kurt ibn Jammah al-Abdi has discovered the corpse of Rostam farrokhzad, the highest commander of Sassanid army during this battle.

The death of Rostam shocked the entire Sassanid, which prompted Sa'ad to instruct general assault to all the Muslim soldiers and ended the four day length battles which resulted the annihilation of Sassanid main forces mustered in Qadisiyyah. During this battle, the Rashidun army has lost one of their most celebrated hero named Abu Mihjan al-Thaqafi, whose death were witnessed by Amr.

According to Mohammed Hussein Heikal, Amr was rewarded a massive 2,000 Dirham spoils of war by Sa'ad for his astounding personal effort in battle of Qadisiyyah, although he did not earn bigger rewards which were reserved for those who memorized Qur'an, since Amr was not included as one of Hafiz. According to the book of Abu al-Faraj as-Shi'i al-Isfahani, it is during this battle that Amr revealed the name of his sword, Dhu al-Nun, from his taunting poem towards the Sassanid army.

Battle of Jalula 

Later, Amr participated in the battle of Jalula, where he reported to played important role during this battle along with al-Qa'qa, Tulayha, Hijr ibn 'Adi, and Qays ibn Maksuh. According to Baladhuri, Amr were appointed as commander of Rashidun cavalry during this battle. At night, Al-Qa'qa brings a number of elite cavalry to they reached the door of the ditch. Among these horsemen are veterans such as Amr, Tulayha, Qays ibn Maksuh and Hijr ibn Adi, along with several horsemens from Zubaydi clan.

Then as the battle started According to firsthand witness named Muhaffiz, al Qa'qa units including Amr and the others managed to slip inside the trench between Jalula fortress and the still engaging Sassanid army, capturing the said trench while the main army of Sassanid under command of Khurrazad still busy fight the Rashidun main forces. This act caused panic among the Sassanids as they began retreating, while the Rashidun forces, noticing al-Qa'qa and his units has penetrated and taking position on the trench behind the Sassanid army. Amr reportedly performing admirably in the battle. It is said the entire battlefield were scattered by corpses of the Sassanid army, thus became the name of the area and this historical battlefield as "Jalula" (dead bodies scattered around). And according to report, as the Sassanid leaving their treasures and families within the barricaded trenches, as Amr and the cavalry of Rashidun has managed to capture the trench, they found massive spoils in the form of numerous captives for enslave and about nine thousands horses which being secured in the aftermath of the battle. One of the notable captives from this battle were a mother of Amr ibn Shurahil, a Tabi'un hadith scholar.

Further conquest of Persia & upper Mesopotamia 

Later, after the establishment of Kufa garrison city, Amr were among a notables from Madhhij clan who settling in Kufa. During the tenure of Sa'd ibn Abi Waqqas as governor in Kufa, there are scandalous accusation regarding Sa'd unjust rule in Iraq which being responded by Umar to send his agents to check and interview the populace in Kufa regarding the conduct of Sa'd during his rule, while Sa'd himself are called to Medina for interrogation. Then as come the turn of Amr interview, as during that time he is staying in Kufa, Amr testified in defense of Sa'd against the complaints and accusation of the Sa'd duty in Kufa, as according to Amr, the rule of Sa'd were "...just in law, caring the poors, humble in nature, and fair when giving rewards...". At sometimes during Mujashi ibn Mas'ud al-Sulami governorate in Basra, Mujashi has bestowed upon Amr an Asian sword of al-Qala'i, a slave who could cook bread, ten thousand Dirham, a foal mare with preserved pedigree from al-Ghabra horse (dust colored type of Arabian horse). It is noted by Cordoban writer Ibn ʿAbd Rabbih in his anthology, Al-ʿIqd al-Farīd that Mujashi were belonged to Banu Sulaym, a tribe which known as mortal enemy of Zubaydi that Amr belonged to. The Sulaim has engaged in many battles against Amr in the past. However, Mujashi did not bear ill will towards Amr and instead he recognized the bravery of Amr, despite in Islam era he now in position as superior of Amr. Mujashi even reported also further throwing additional rewards such as shields, swords, and another warfare equipments.

Later, Amr were continued to participate in further expansion towards Sassanid territory in Khorasan, where he was sent by Abdallah ibn Amir to serve under Ahnaf ibn Qais to expand and subdued the cities of Marw al-Rudh and Balkh through fighting. However, their advance were halt as the winter are coming, which prompted Ahnaf to ask whether they should continue or not, which replied by Amr it is up to Ahnaf. Ahnaf then decided they should return to Balkh and stay in that town instead.

Later, during the conquest by Iyad ibn Ghanm to the northern side of the euphrates river, Amr ibn Ma'dikarib were briefly mentioned by Waqidi has saw some actions in this campaign. Amr then assigned by Khalid ibn al-Walid to lead about 200 Rashidun cavalry to march towards Harran As Amr troops passed by Edessa, he capitulated the city before they reached Harran, which populace then surrendered peacefully.

Amr ibn Ma'dikarib also testifying about the continuation of the conquests of Persian territory, which now under command of Rabi ibn Ziyad al-Harithi that encompassed from Sawad, Fars Province, until they managed to reach and captured the mountainous area of Makar.

Battle of Nahavand & Death 

On the eve of the battle of Nahāvand, the caliphate heard the Sassanid armed forces from Mah, Qom, Hamadan, Ray, Isfahan, Azerbaijan, and Nahavand has gathered in area of Nahavand to counter the caliphate invasion. Caliph Umar responded by assembling war councils to discuss the strategy to face the Sassanids in Nahavand. As the battle plans has been set, at first the caliph want to lead the army himself, however, Ali urged the caliph to instead delegate the battlefield commands not by himself, but rather to the field commanders, which then agreed by the caliph as he decided to send Amr, Zubayr ibn al-Awwam, Tulayha, Abdullah ibn Amr, Al-Ash'ath ibn Qays and others under the command of Al-Nu'man ibn Muqrin as reinforcement to Nahavand. As they arrived in Nahavand, Amr were sent as scout to gather information about the enemy forces before the battle. Amr travelled in three days journey exploring the fields around the area in Nahavand to gather information regarding the enemy strength.

At first, the battle were lasted from Wednesday in the form of intense skirmishes until Thursday as the Sassanid forces refused to leave their position within trenches despite their superior number, until the last day, as Al-Nu'man ibn Muqrin asking the opinion of his commander how to break the Sassanid resistance, as they entrenched themselves behind spiked ditch, Amr opined they should try to force a daring breakthrough maneuver against their lines to break the Sassanid resistances. However, Tulayha opined different strategy to bait them to leave their position to the more open field, which were agreed by the other commanders.

Then, as the last day of the battle started, through cunning ploy of Tulayha strategy to bait the bulk of Sassanid forces to chase them as the Rashidun forces pretended to withdraw while peppering the Sassanids with showers of arrows by their cavalry archers. As the Sassanids chasing the withdrawing army of Rashidun, the heavily outnumbered Rashidun army suddenly mounting counterattack from the favorable position and fought hard against the onslaught of more than hundred thousands Sassanid united forces, which not only managed to stop the Sassanid forces on their track, but also struck heavy losses on them and causing the entire Sassanid army collapsed. Nu'aym ibn Muqarrin, the brother of al-Nu'man, depicted the battle rages intensely as he saw Amr ibn Ma'dikarib and Zubayr ibn al-Awwam both fought furiously and full of vigor, while Nu'aym saw the heads of Sassanid soldiers flying around the two warriors "like trees that were uprooted from their roots,".

However, Amr has fallen during this battle, Along with his comrade Tulayha. Abu al-Farraj recorded Amr were buried along with Nu'man, the Rashidun supreme commander who also fallen during this battle. Other record has reported Amr were fallen in the year 21 AH in a place called Ruzah between Ray and Qom, and was buried there. Abu al-Faraj al-Isfahani on the other hand reported from witness named Khalid ibn Qatan that Khalid had meet with Amr, who still lived during the caliphate of Uthman. although it has deemed dubious as the narrator chain were weak. Meanwhile, there are other similarly dubious account recorded by Abu Hanifa Dinawari which sourced from al-Farra that Amr ibn Ma'di-Yakrib still lived during the reign of Mu'awiyah. According to Abu Hanifa, al-Farra account were ambiguously traced to untraceable source.

Personal characteristic 
Amr was known for his impressive physical build, as it is said Amr was so tall and huge in stature, that his feet touched the ground when he rode a horse, This particular characteristic was also remarked by the second Rashidun caliph Umar to praise Amr's impressive physical build, as the caliph declared that Amr were "one of God's finest creation" for the perfection of his musculature and posture. As huge person, Amr also reportedly possessing a huge appetite, as he admitted that when eating a full dish of camel meat, he will consume the camel's meat up to its bones, while he also drank huge amounts of milk. The size of his appetite was once recorded during a visit to caliph Umar's residence, where he was treated with large amounts of dishes such as breads and raisins, which still did not appease him until there was no more to give, prompting the caliph to say that he has no more food in the house, before they continued to talk.

Adi ibn Hatim once spoke to Muhammad and praised several figures as most accomplished humans in their era, where Adi praised Amr ibn Ma'dikarib as the best horse rider of the era. Basra philologist and grammarian Al-Mubarrad recorded that caliph Umar of Rashidun once asked his peoples about the best things among Arab peoples, which responded by his peoples that the most generous were Hatim al-Tai, the best poet were Imru' al-Qais, and the best mounted hero were Amir ibn Ma'dikarib while his sword, as-Samsara, are the best sword known in Arabia.

Jabir ibn Abd Allah praised Amr and Tulayha as among soldiers that participating in the battle of al-Qadisiyah who did not desired worldly gain and exceptionally pious.

As master of Equestrianism Amr were recorded possessed multiple horses at least four different horses as his mounts, such as horses which he named al-Ya'suf, al-Adhwa'a, al-'Athaf, and al-Ba'yat. Regarding the horsemanship, Amr also recorded has boasted to the caliph about his expertize and knowledge regarding horse breeds, particularly the Arabian breed.

Legacy 

As powerful warrior with proficiency with weapons, in the recorded of conversation between caliph Umar and Amr, it is mentioned about both men's mentioning about the proficiency of many terms regarding weapons and equipment which included the art and usage of swords, armor, shield, bows and arrows. While regarding the martial art of weapon usage, it is implied the Tahtib martial art which involved the mastery use of sticks or spear. The swords belonged to Amr were become a source of various legends and myths in the later era, as Abbasid caliphs were known with the possession of a famous sword to Amr Ibn Ma'dī-Karib, after it has been purchased by the first Umayyad caliph Mu'awiyah. Thus, it further fueled the martial legends surrounded and represented by heroism literatures and poetries about Amr. However, some of epic deeds by Amr sometimes were confused as being attributed to another figure named Sayf ibn Dhi Yazan.

Various other vague accounts also narrated another mythical legends that includes that swords belong to Amr, ash-Shamshamah. Ash-Shamshamah was said weighed six pounds and being adorned with gold on it inscription. The material were said to be used from irons founded in Jebel Nuqm, a mountain that overlooking San'a. According to medieval Arabian poet Abu al-Hawl al-Hamiri, the sword feature was green colored between its borders. It was possessed by Abbasid caliph al-Wathiq. According to several medieval chronicles, the sword were belonged from the era of ʿĀd tribe which preserved from generation to generation until it Amr receive it from Himyarite Kingdom ruler named Alqamah bin Dhi Qaifan.

Another Amr sword called Dhu al-Nun sword were believed as gifts from Queen of Sheba, legendary queen of Yemen, to prophet Solomon in Islam from the kingdom of Israel. Regarding the other sword, Abu al-Faraj as-Shi'i al-Isfahani mentioned the literary evidence of Amr named Dhu al-Nun in the battle poetry which originated from the battle of Qadisiyyah. Another sword which possessed by Amr were a sword nicknamed as-Sheeyamah (الصيامة), which given to him by Amr ibn al-As. Meanwhile, Amr most famous sword, as-Samsarah, were believed originated from the extinct tribe of ʿĀd which lived during the time of prophet Hud, which narrated through Amr own confession through his poem, which he hinted his sword previously belonged from a man named Dhu al-Qaifah ibn 'Alas ibn Ja'dan, who has acquired that sword as an artifact of ʿĀd tribe. According to Amr, as-Samsarah previously owned by 'Alqamah ibn Dhi Qayfan, one of the descendants of Qii Bayh ibn Qi Qayfan al-Akbar, who were believed found the sword from the ʿĀd tribe. The sword came into possession of Abbasid caliphs such as Harun al-Rashid, and Al-Mahdi.

The Islamic era poetry and historical narratives commentaries also included the appraisal for Amr for his participation in Islamic conquest, particularly in Qadisiyyah and Nahavand as appraisal, in addition to his pre-Islamic saga. Ibn Kathir attributed As the battle of Nahāvand, which are the battle where Amr has fallen, marked the dissolution and the fall of the last of the grand marshals of the Sasanian Imperial army and were pivotal for further Muslim expansion into modern day Iran, along with the caliphate permanent consolidation of their presence in Iraq.

Islam 

In Islamic belief, Amr were being remembered and included as one of Companions of the Prophet, which status as companion generation were attested by the record of Ibn Hajar. As a companion of Muhammad who has distinguishing service during Early Muslim conquests, Muslim scholars of later generations has worked on the memorials and biographical record about Amr ibn Ma'dikarib service during his later half of his life and his martyrdom during the battle for Islam conquest,

The records from Ali ibn al-Athir in his biography works, Usd al-ghabah fi marifat al-Saḥabah, and Al-Isabah fi tamyiz al Sahabah by Ibn Hajar also listed the brief biography of Amr, while Ibn Hajar recorded the authority about Amr has survived the advanced age until the caliphate of Mu'awiya I. Later scholars such as Ibn Taymiyyah annotation from at-Tartusi also praised the bravery of Amr during those campaigns. As Amr using his oratory skill to motivate the Muslim soldiers during Qadisiyyah, both religious study and middle east historical study has recorded and examined the historiograph reconstruction of Amr theatrical and poetry during the battle of Qadisiyyah.

Ibn Kathir has quoted in his book al-Bidayah wa an-Nihayah the shower of appraisals of Amr services during the battle of Qadisiyyah from both of Amr contemporary and later Islam history authors who have spoke their recognition of Amr roles during the battles against Sassanid empire. Modern Saudi Arabian scholar and author Aid al-Qarni has appraisal of Amr as, in Aid words, "setting an example of courage" for his conduct in the battle of Qadisiyyah. Ibn Kathir also recorded the compilation of the Hadith narrated through the authority of Amr in his different works, Jami' al-Masanid wa as-Sunan.

Interpretations & jurisprudences 
Aside from his military service to Islam, Amr also passed down a Hadith which reported that he heard, regarding the recitation of Talbiyah during hajj pilgrimage ritual, as Hadith scholars recorded Muhammad taught him Talbiyah. which text are: 

On the other hands, based on critical commentaries and review from Al-Suyuti works, Amr ibn Ma'di Yakrib were also known as several Sahabah who had possessed several understanding regarding the Asbab al-Nuzul or revelation of certain Qur'an verses. Ibn Hisham has reported the warning of Amr towards Qays ibn Makshuh, as Qays has threatened Salman ibn Rabia al-Bahili, administrator of the caliphate stable and Hima(camels massive breeding livestock in Nejd), which responded by Amr who reprimanded Qays from threatening Salman with advising poet to beware of such prideful attitude while reminding him the fate of the strength of the powerful ʿĀd peoples which preceding them does not helping them to avert disaster from them.

Prominent Saudi scholar and permanent council of scholars member, Muhammad ibn al-Uthaymeen, also quoted the poet of Amr ibn Ma'dikarib in his book, Tafsir al-Uthaymin, when explaining the tafsir or interpretation of the verses Al-An'am chapter of Qur'an regarding slavery to Allah in context of servitude of whole creatures towards their Creator, in general sense.

Later scholars, such as 12-13th century Hanbalite scholar Abu al-Barakat Zayn al Abidin ibn al-Munaji also recorded the war ethics regarding Ghanima or spoils of war according to Islam jurisprudence, where he quoted the act of Amr ibn Ma'dikarib when killing one of Sassanid commander bodyguard in battle and cutting both hands of said bodyguard to acquire the golden bracelets on his wrists, Zayn al-Abidin used this case as the allowance of certain soldiers to acquire the spoils from the enemy he personally killed by his own hands, which in line with one of the ruling from one Hadith from Muhammad regarding such condition.

However, Amr once made a mistake of Qur'an tafsir regarding liquor, which Al-Ma'idah revelation of verse 90-91 were completely forbidding such intoxicating consumption. Amr first though the ruling about liquor were not completely forbidden based on the verse of 93, which view, according to Ibn Qudamah, were corrected by Ibn Abbas and caliph Umar. This critical examination also remarked and explained by Ibn Hajar al-Asqalani in his compilation and Hadith explanation book, The Meadows of the Righteous.

Poetries 
Werner Daum noted his assessment that Amr was probably the most famous and most legendary of the ancient Arab heroes, who roams the land seeking honour in glorious battles and through poetry through his sword prowess.

The figure of Amr were celebrated among Arabian poetry experts as accomplished poet as Jawad Ali said that Amr were genuinely gifted in oratory skill and poets. As an expert of poetries, the poets recited by Amr were preserved and documented until modern era. Yahya al-Juburi, modern era Arabic literature expert has worked on a commentary book regarding the poetries compilation within "Diwan Amr ibn Ma'dikarib".  One of Amr preserved poetry that has been quoted by Irfan Shahîd, were a poet about Amr appraisal for the Ghassanid, which Amr said "lords during Jahiliyya era and stars in Islam."

Amr fame in eloquence of poetries has placed him among similar fame with other notable poets such as Harith ibn Zalim, Amr ibn Tufail, and Mukhalis ibn Muzahim. Many stories and epic poetries produced by Amr has survived and became subjects of Arabian poet studies, Amr were regarded as an example of pre-Islamic heroic figure comparable with Antarah and Durayd, whose also remembered as great warrior and poet expert. The Qasida poetries produced by Amr which preserved in modern times were often revolved around heroism martial pride theme. However, Amr style of poetries also sometimes used a simile from nature phenomena, such as comparation of the scene of lightning which appeared over clouds which he analogized in resemblance of the group of women gathering together in mourning.

The literary communities of Arabia not only reported Amr proficiency with poetries and oral histories, but also often took his battle experience to reciting poems, as according to his nephew, Qays ibn Makshuh. Caliph Umar particularly fond to listening the stories about Amr marvellous adventures in the past, such as one of particular story which passed by Amr in the record of Ibn al-Jawzi, which is when Umar asking Amr about his past battle experience regarding most cowardly men he ever faced during his life. Amr then gave story that in one of his past battles, he faced a huge men sitting next to his horse, which then asking Amr's name after threatening him to kill him. Just as Amr giving his name, the man shocked and terrified, in a great panic that he died just from the shock alone. Regarding his personal adventures which narrated by Amr, al-Maqrizi recorded another story he told Umar were one of which during his past adventure when raiding one of Arab tribes, he met a famous hunter named 'Amr the dog', who always hunting lions, and always accompanied by dogs during his hunts or raids. As Amr ibn Ma'dikarib approached him while killing one lion and wallowing in the lion's blood, while seemingly eating the lion's corpse. However, suddenly a snake bitten 'Amr the dog' hand, causing him to die instantly, which prompted Amr ibn Ma'dikarib to observe his dead body took his weapons. Meanwhile, in another conversation Amr which recorded by Ibn Manzur, Amr also praised an Arabian knight and his former enemy named Abbas ibn Mirdas as-Sulami, whom Amr claimed personally taught in the art of poetry. On separate authority, the figure of Abbas ibn Mirdas were reportedly Tha'lab Ahmad Yahya as once has been defeated and captured in battle by Amr ibn Ma'dikarib.

As there are numerous anecdotes that recorded during Amr conversation with the second Rashidun caliphs, Some of Amr contemporaries in caliphate has questioned the veracity of Amr stories in his many poetries, which he responded to defend himself in front of caliph Umar, that he testified how can be he accused as liar as was never lying once even before Islam. Umar were indeed reportedly crosschecking the accounts of Amr, where Umar continued to listen to Amr regarding military matters, as Umar has interviewed the populace of Yemen, who testified that Amr were indeed a champion acknowledged by Yemeni peoples. Abbasid era scholar Ibn Qutaybah also attested the reliability and truthfulness of Amr claim and dismissing the critics. The poetries of Amr has deemed as source of Arabian heroism and martial culture. However, most of Amr Sirah or epic literatures were lost and most of his deeds mistakenly attributed to Sayf ibn Dhi Yazan, a semi-legendary Yemen Arabic heroic figure.

In the Malay and Indonesian folktales, Amr became one of leading figure of fictional chronicle of Hikayat Amir Hamzah, since the Hikayat poetries that fictionalized the heroic figures of early Islam were used in such era to be used by inspire the locals to resist the Dutch invaders.

Descendants 
The direct patrilineal descendants of Amr are many. Many distinguished Arab tribes descended from Amru and include Al-Obaid and Al-Dulaim. Most of Amr's descendants are found residing in Saudi Arabia, Iraq and Syria. Their numbers have been estimated to far exceed 20 million and their place in history is assured, Amr is famed for producing many poets, warriors and distinguished Sheikhs.

As the diaspora of Zubaid tribe spread across the ages, several sub branches of them are claimed to be direct patrilineal descendants Amr ibn Ma'dikarib, such as the Jubur tribe. Abbas al-Azzawi wrote in his book, "al-Ash'ar al-Iraq" (عشائر العراق), that the Jubur then technically forming the smaller sub branch of Zubaid clans through Amr,  From several texts it was passed to Amr ibn Ma'di Karb al-Zubaydi from Zabid al-Asghar, who are from Bani Amr, and in Najd al-Jabour and al-Izza are from the Subai' family, who are from grouped clans, which descended from Jabr ibn Maktoum Al Zubaidi who are recorded as descendant of Bahij ibn Dhubyan, who are the 14th descendant of Jamish ibn Marhaj, a great-grandson of Thawr ibn Amr, son of Amr ibn Ma'dikarib.

From the Jubur tribe, the as-Shuwaikhat clan which populate the city of Ad-Dawr in Iraq also remarked their prestigious lineage from Amr.

another sub branch clan of Zubayd in modern time, notably the Al Uqaydat, which according to Max von Oppenheim, it is the largest tribe in all of Mesopotamia, were reportedly claimed as descendant of Amr as well.

References

Notes

Inline citations

Bibliography

External link biography 
 
 
 
 
 

Zubaidi clan genealogy
 
 

642 deaths
6th-century Arabic poets
7th-century Arabs
7th-century Arabic poets
7th-century Muslims
Arab generals
Arab Muslims
Arab people of the Arab–Byzantine wars
Arabic-language poets
Converts to Islam
History of Yemen
History of Iraq
Arab history
Medieval Arabic literature
Military personnel killed in action
People of the Muslim conquest of Persia
People of the Muslim conquest of the Levant
People from the Rashidun Caliphate
Prisoners and detainees of the Rashidun Caliphate
People of the Ridda Wars
Sahabah hadith narrators
Yemeni Muslims
Yemeni poets
544 births